Wu Nien-pin (born 4 February 1983) is a Taiwanese former swimmer, who specialized in freestyle and medley events. He is a two-time Olympian (2000 and 2004), and a seventh-place finalist in the 100 m freestyle at the 2002 Asian Games in Busan, South Korea. A graduate of information engineering at National Taiwan University in Taipei, Wu also trained full-time for the university's swimming squad.

Wu made his Olympic debut, as a 17-year-old teen, at the 2000 Summer Olympics in Sydney. He failed to reach the top 16 in any of his individual events, finishing fifty-fifth in the 100 m freestyle (52.72), thirty-eighth in the 200 m freestyle (1:54.58), and forty-fourth in the 200 m individual medley (2:08.85).

At the 2004 Summer Olympics in Athens, Wu swam only in two events with one day in between. He posted FINA B-standard entry times of 52.03 (100 m freestyle) and 2:08.12 (200 m individual medley) from the National University Games in Taipei. On the fifth day of the Games, Wu placed fifty-fourth in the 100 m freestyle. He edged out Singapore's Mark Chay to take a seventh spot in heat three by a quarter of a second (0.25) in 52.58. The following day, Wu managed to repeat a forty-fourth-place effort in the 200 m individual medley. Swimming in heat two, Wu saved a sixth spot over Turkey's Orel Oral by 0.12 of a second in 2:08.72.

References

1983 births
Living people
Taiwanese male swimmers
Olympic swimmers of Taiwan
Swimmers at the 2000 Summer Olympics
Swimmers at the 2004 Summer Olympics
Swimmers at the 1998 Asian Games
Swimmers at the 2002 Asian Games
Taiwanese male freestyle swimmers
Male medley swimmers
Sportspeople from Taipei
Asian Games competitors for Chinese Taipei